Grammodes microgonia is a moth of the family Erebidae first described by George Hampson in 1910.

Distribution
This species is known from Zambia.

References

Hampson, G. F. (1910). "Zoological collections from Northern Rhodesia and adjacent territories: Lepidoptera Phalaenae". Proceedings of the Zoological Society of London. 1910 (2): 388–510, pls. 36–41.

Endemic fauna of Zambia
Ophiusina
Moths described in 1910